Pennsylvania State Senate District 27 includes part of Luzerne County and all of Columbia County, Montour County, Northumberland County,  and Snyder County. It is currently represented by Republican Lynda Schlegel Culver.

District profile
The district includes the following areas:

All of Columbia County

Luzerne County

 Black Creek Township
 Butler Township
 Conyngham
 Conyngham Township
 Dorrance Township
 Fairview Township
 Hollenback Township
 Huntington Township
 Nescopeck
 Nescopeck Township
 New Columbus
 Nuangola
 Rice Township
 Salem Township
 Shickshinny
 Slocum Township
 Sugarloaf Township
 Wright Township

All of Montour County

All of Northumberland County

All of Snyder County

Senators

References

Pennsylvania Senate districts
Government of Columbia County, Pennsylvania
Government of Dauphin County, Pennsylvania
Government of Luzerne County, Pennsylvania
Government of Montour County, Pennsylvania
Government of Northumberland County, Pennsylvania
Government of Snyder County, Pennsylvania